Treat is an unincorporated community in Pope County, Arkansas, United States.

The community was named for one of its earliest settlers, Polk Treat.

References

Unincorporated communities in Pope County, Arkansas
Unincorporated communities in Arkansas